This is a list of notable alumni of Denison University in Granville, Ohio.

Academia

Susan Campbell Baldridge - psychologist; Provost, Middlebury College
Cynthia Baum – clinical psychologist and academic administrator 
David H. Bayley - pioneer in policing research and former Distinguished Professor Emeritus, School of Criminal Justice, SUNY Albany
William G. Bowen - former President of Princeton University, current President of the Andrew W. Mellon Foundation
Richard Brandt - professor of philosophy, Swarthmore College and University of Michigan
Ernest DeWitt Burton -  biblical scholar
Steven R. Carter - literary critic and academic
George Cressey - geographer, author, and academic
Frederick German Detweiler - sociologist 
George Amos Dorsey - ethnographer
Lottie Estelle Granger - president, Iowa State Teachers' Association
Stephen Holmes - Walter E. Meyer Professor of Law, New York University
John S. Lowe - professor and expert in energy law
Roger H. Martin - 14th president of Randolph-Macon College
Jeffrey Masten - Shakespeare and sexuality studies scholar, Northwestern University; Guggenheim fellow
Kirtley F. Mather - geologist; professor and department chairman at Harvard University; civil libertarian and author
Thomas Skidmore - historian and scholar specialized in Brazilian history
Maria Tatar - John L. Loeb Professor of Germanic Languages and Literatures; Chair of the Committee on Degrees in Folklore and Mythology at Harvard University
Stephen Tuttle - musicologist and former chairman of the department of music at the University of Virginia

Business
James Anderson - head of corporate communications and marketing, WarnerMedia; interim head of communications, CNN, Worldwide
Samuel Armacost - former president, director, and CEO of BankAmerica Corporation
Joe Banner - President and CEO of the Cleveland Browns
Brad Blum - former CEO of Burger King
George Bodenheimer - Executive Chairman of ESPN former President of ESPN and ABC Sports
John Canning, Jr. - Chairman, Madison Dearborn Partners
Mark Dalton - CEO of the Tudor Investment Corporation
Edward Andrew Deeds - engineer, inventor and industrialist
Michael Eisner - former Chairman and CEO of the Walt Disney Company
William Esrey - former Chief Executive of Sprint Corporation
John V. Faraci - chairman and chief executive officer of International Paper
Bill Giles - chairman and part owner of Major League Baseball's Philadelphia Phillies
Mark Haines - co-anchor of CNBC’s Squawk on the Street
Terry Jones - founder of Travelocity.com and Kayak.com
Andrea Mutters - Chief Information Officer of McHenry Advisers
 Ralph Schlosstein - Chairman Emeritus of Evercore and former president and Co-founder of BlackRock

Arts and Entertainment
Susan V. Booth - Artistic Director, Alliance Theatre, Atlanta; Artistic Director, Goodman Theatre, Chicago
Steve Carell - screen and television actor
Roe Conn - radio personality, WLS 890AM, Chicago
Luke Ebbin - Grammy nominated record producer, songwriter and composer
John Davidson - stage and television actor; game show host, including Hollywood Squares
Jennifer Garner - screen and television actress
Jeffrey Hatcher - playwright and screenwriter
Hal Holbrook - stage, screen and television actor, known for portrayal of Mark Twain
John Jeffcoat - screenwriter and film director, known for Outsourced
Ademir Kenović - film director and producer
Nancy Lynn - acrobatic pilot, killed in 2006 Culpeper Airfest crash
Ann Magnuson - actress, performance artist, and nightclub performer
John Malm Jr. - former manager of Trent Reznor and his band Nine Inch Nails
Daniel Meyer - conductor and musical director
Alex Moffat - actor and comedian
P-Star (Priscilla Diaz) - rapper, actress, singer, model, director, DJ
Hollis Resnik - singer and actress
José Rivera - first Puerto Rican screenwriter to be nominated for an Academy Award
John Schuck - screen, stage, and television actor
Kurt Vincent, director of The Lost Arcade
Andrew Levitt, drag queen known as Nina West
 Chase Hilt, Good Mythical Morning Producer.
 Chelsey Warner, Associate Producer - The Boys, Amazon

Charlie Burg - singer song writer
Meghan McGuire - writer and comedian
Ned Bittinger - portrait painter and illustrator

Government
Richard B. Austin - judge, United States District Court for the Northern District of Illinois
Ruth Sarles Benedict - anti-war activist, researcher and journalist
John T. Chain, Jr. - retired U.S. Air Force General
Robert Dold - U.S. Representative for 
Edmund Burke Fairfield - minister, educator, and politician, including 12th Lieutenant Governor of Michigan
Carty Finkbeiner - former mayor of Toledo, Ohio
Tony P. Hall - United States Ambassador to the United Nations Agencies for Food and Agriculture and United States Representative from Ohio
Andrew S. Hanen - judge, United States District Court for the Southern District of Texas
Judson Harmon - 45th Governor of Ohio and 41st United States Attorney General
Leonard D. Heaton - former Surgeon General of the United States Army
Edgar Winters Hillyer - judge, United States District Court for the District of Nevada
Douglas Holtz-Eakin - former Director of the Congressional Budget Office and former chief economic policy adviser to U.S. Senator John McCain's 2008 presidential campaign
Randy Hopper - former member of the Wisconsin State Senate
Sue W. Kelly - former member of the United States Congress from New York
Robert W. Levering - former United States Congressman
Richard Lugar - United States Senator from Indiana; on the Board of Trustees
Kenneth E. Melson - former ATF director
Jim Petro - former Ohio Attorney General
Lewis A. Sachs - former US Assistant Secretary of the Treasury
A. W. Sheldon - Associate Justice, Arizona Territorial Supreme Court
Erastus B. Tyler - Union Army general in the American Civil War
H. Clay Van Voorhis - former US Congressman
Ed Weber - former US Congressman
Yu Tsune-chi - Chinese Ambassador to Italy and Spain, United Nations delegate who took part in the San Francisco Conference
Allen Zollars - Justice of the Indiana Supreme Court

Literature
James Clear - author and speaker about habits
James Frey - screenwriter and author; A Million Little Pieces, featured by Oprah's Book Club
Michael Glaser - Poet Laureate of Maryland
Lauren Shakely - poet, editor, and publisher
Pam Houston - author, speaker, teacher

Religion
 Roger Ames - American Anglican bishop
 Edgar J. Goodspeed - liberal theologian
 Randolph Hollerith - Dean of Washington National Cathedral
 James Madison Pendleton - 19th-century Baptist preacher, educator and theologian

Science
Homer Burton Adkins - organic chemist
John Berton - computer graphics animator and visual effects supervisor
Richard B. Brandt - philosopher
William Ernest Castle - early American geneticist
William E. Forsythe - physicist
George Stibitz - scientist, early pioneer of computer with Bell Labs

Sports
Dan Daub - Major League Baseball player, 1892–1897
Woody Hayes - football coach of Ohio State, 1951–1978
Ken Meyer - former head coach of the National Football League's San Francisco 49ers
Johnny O'Connell - professional sports car racer
Bobby Rahal - Indianapolis 500 champion
John Robic - assistant men's basketball coach at the University of Kentucky

References

External links 
 Denison University

Denison University alumni